The Lost '60s Recordings contains tracks from singles released by The Trophies and The Fleas in the early sixties for Challenge Records, plus solo tracks by the individual band members. Those bandmembers were Ricky Nelson, Jerry Fuller, Glen Campbell and Dave Burgess.

Track listing

 "Desire" (Fuller/Dobro) - The Trophies
 "Doggone It" (Burgess) - The Trophies
 "Everlovin'" (Burgess) - Dave Burgess And The Chimes
 "A Wonder Like You" (Fuller) - Jerry Fuller
 "Tears" (Burgess) - The Fleas
 "Shy Away" (Burgess) - Jerry Fuller
 "First Love Never Dies" (Morris/Seals) - Jerry Fuller
 "I'm Available" (Burgess/Earl) - Dave Burgess
 "I Laughed So Hard I Cried" (Burgess) - The Trophies
 "Guilty Of Loving You" (Fuller) - Jerry Fuller
 "Scratchin'" (Burgess/Fuller) - The Fleas
 "Betty My Angel" (Fuller/Silva) - Jerry Fuller
 "Peg O' My Heart" (Bryan/Fisher) - The Trophies
 "The Place Where I Cry" (Fuller/Burgess) - Jerry Fuller
 "Charlene" (Fuller/Silva) - Jerry Fuller
 "Felicia" (Burgess) - The Trophies
 "That's All I Want From You" (Rotha/Rotter) - The Trophies
 "Turn Around, Look at Me" (Capehart) - Glen Campbell

Personnel
The Trophies/The Fleas:
Ricky Nelson - lead vocals
Dave Burgess - vocals, rhythm guitar
Glen Campbell - lead guitar
Jerry Fuller - vocals, guitar
 Backing vocals - Jimmy Seals and Dash Crofts

Production
Producers - Dave Burgess, Joe Johnson, Jerry Capehart 
Mastered by Steve Massie/Steve Massie Productions
Arranged by Ernie Freeman
Collection produced by Cary E. Mansfield, Steve Massie
Liner notes by Bill Dahl
Art direction/design by Bill Pitzonka
Photos courtesy of Tony Barrett, Dave Burgess, Jerry Fuller, Michael Ochs Archives

Ricky Nelson albums
2003 compilation albums
Glen Campbell compilation albums
Jerry Fuller albums
Varèse Sarabande compilation albums